Klara Stepanivna Luchko (1 July 1925 – 26 March 2005) was a Soviet, Russian and Ukrainian actress known for her roles in the Soviet cinema.

She received the title of People's Artist of the USSR, the highest honour that could be bestowed to a cinema artist, in 1978. She was awarded the Order "For Merit to the Fatherland" 4th class  (2000).

Selected filmography
 Michurin (1948) as guest
 The Young Guard (Молодая гвардия, 1948) as Aunt Marina
 Cossacks of the Kuban (Кубанские казаки, 1949) as Darya Shelest
 The Return of Vasili Bortnikov (Возращение Василия Бортникова, 1953) as Natalya
 A Big Family (Большая семья, 1954) as Lida Zhurbina
 Twelfth Night (Двенадцатая ночь, 1955) as Viola / Sebastian
 A Snow Fairy Tale (Снежная сказка, 1959) as Black Soul
 Dreams of Love – Liszt (Szerelmi álmok – Liszt, 1970) as Marie d'Agoult
 The Gypsy (Цыган, 1979) as Claudia Pukhlyakova
 The Casket of Maria Medici (Ларец Марии Медичи, 1980) as Madam Locar
 Do Not Part with Your Beloved (С любимыми не расставайтесь, 1980) as Larisa's mother
 Carnival (Карнавал, 1981) as Josephine Viktorovna, the wife of Mikhail Solomatin
 We, The Undersigned (Мы, нижеподписавшиеся, 1981) as Violetta Matveyevna Nuikina
 Anxious Sunday (Тревожное воскресенье, 1983) as Anna Golovina
 Budulai's Return (Вовзращение Будулая, 1985) as Claudia Pukhlyakova

References

External links
 

1925 births
2005 deaths
Russian film actresses
Soviet film actresses
Ukrainian film actresses
Russian people of Ukrainian descent
Cannes Film Festival Award for Best Actress winners
Honored Artists of the RSFSR
People's Artists of the RSFSR
People's Artists of the USSR
Recipients of the Order "For Merit to the Fatherland", 4th class
Stalin Prize winners
Gerasimov Institute of Cinematography alumni
Communist Party of the Soviet Union members
Burials at Novodevichy Cemetery